Tulum Municipality is one of the eleven municipalities that make up the Mexican state of Quintana Roo. It became a municipality when it was formed on 13 March 2008, at which time it was separated from Solidaridad Municipality.

Tulum is home to the Maya archaeological sites of Tulum and Cobá.

Geography

The municipality of Tulum borders the municipalities of Solidaridad to the north and Felipe Carrillo Puerto to the south, in the state of Quintana Roo. It also borders Chemax Municipality and Valladolid Municipality in the state of Yucatán on the northwest, and the Caribbean Sea on the east.

Orography and hydrography

Like the rest of the peninsula's surface the land has a limestone base that does not allow the formation of surface water flows such as rivers and streams; the water instead flows in underground rivers that sometimes rise to the surface in the cenotes. Lakes and cenotes are the major bodies of water in the municipality.

Communities 

The municipality consists of 170 populated localities, plus an additional 224 unpopulated localities, and includes part of a biosphere reserve (Sian Ka'an, which lies mostly in neighboring Felipe Carrillo Puerto Municipality). The largest localities (cities, towns, and villages) are:

Demographics

Tulum has 46,721 inhabitants according to the 2020 census, a figure that reflects over five percent annual growth since the last census in 2010.  There is an additional 15,000 to 20,000 people living and working in Tulum as part of its floating population. That number rises and falls with the tourist season and is not reflected in the census figures.

References

 01
Municipalities of Quintana Roo